Annan Thangachi is a 1999 Tamil-language drama film directed by Charan Raj. The film stars himself, Shruthi and Ajay, with Janagaraj, Pandu, Thalaivasal Vijay, Indhu, K. R. Vatsala, Vadivukkarasi, and Ajay Rathnam playing supporting roles. It was released  on 7 May 1999. The film was a remake of the Kannada film Thavarina Thottilu also starring Charan Raj and Shruthi.

Plot

Chinna Rasu (Charan Raj) is a rich landlord who treasures his lovely little sister Sarasu (Shruthi). They both lived together with their family friend Azhagu (Pandu). Chinna Rasu is one of the richest people in his village, and he looks for the perfect groom for his sister.

In the meantime, Kodeeswaran (Janagaraj), a cheat game addict, looks for a wealthy bride for his son Baskar (Ajay Krishna) who could afford him a huge dowry. Baskar is a bank officer and perfect gentleman. The marriage broker Chitti (Thalaivasal Vijay) informs Kodeeswaran about Chinna Rasu's fortune. With Chitti's help, Kodeeswaran pretends to be a wealthy businessman and lies about his family condition to Chinna Rasu. Finally, Baskar and Sarasu get married. Kodeeswaran considers Sarasu as The Goose That Laid the Golden Eggs, then he pressures her for money. A few weeks later, when Chitti asks his commission to Kodeeswaran, Kodeeswaran refuses to pay and insults him. In anger and feeling guilty for ruining an innocent girl's life, Chitti reveals all the truth to Azhagu.

Later, Chinna Rasu marries Yashoda (Indhu). More years passed, and Sarasu gave birth to a girl. Chinna Rasu sold most of his lands to give money to Baskar's family and is now crippled with debts. Kodeeswaran used his money to gamble and lost everything, while Baskar lost his job. What transpires next forms the rest of the story.

Cast

Charan Raj as Chinna Rasu
Shruthi as Sarasu
Ajay Krishna as Baskar
Janagaraj as Kodeeswaran, Baskar's father
Pandu as Azhagu
Thalaivasal Vijay as Chitti
Indhu as Yashoda
K. R. Vatsala as Baskar's mother
Vadivukkarasi as Yashoda's sister
Ajay Ratnam as Yashoda's brother
Ravichandran
Bhaskar
Raja
Baby Uma Maheswari

Soundtrack

The film score and the soundtrack were composed by Deva. The soundtrack, released in 1999, features 7 tracks with lyrics written by Ponniyin Selvan.

References

1999 films
1990s Tamil-language films
Indian drama films
Films scored by Deva (composer)
Tamil remakes of Kannada films
1999 directorial debut films